is a Japanese politician of the Liberal Democratic Party, a member of the House of Councillors in the Diet. A native of Kawasaki, Kanagawa, he was elected to the House of Councillors for the first time in 2004 after serving in the city assembly of Kawasaki.

References

External links 
 Official website in Japanese.

Members of the House of Councillors (Japan)
Living people
1945 births
People from Kawasaki, Kanagawa
Liberal Democratic Party (Japan) politicians
Japanese municipal councilors
Politicians from Kanagawa Prefecture